Nial Fennelly (born 3 May 1942) is a retired Irish judge who served as a Judge of the Supreme Court from 2000 to 2014, Advocate General of the European Court of Justice and a Judge of the European Court of Justice from 1995 to 2000.

He was educated at Clongowes Wood College, took a degree in economics at University College Dublin and completed his Bar studies at King's Inns. He was a Barrister-at-Law from 1964 to 1995; when he was appointed as a senior counsel, he based himself full-time in Dublin, but when a junior barrister, he worked both there and on the South Eastern circuit. Fennelly was Chairman of the Bar Council of Ireland shortly before his appointment as Advocate General. Fennelly is president of the Irish Society for European Law.

Fennelly is the sole member of the "Commission of Investigation (Certain Matters relative to An Garda Síochána and other persons)", commonly called the Fennelly Commission, a commission of investigation established in April 2014 by the Government of Ireland to investigate several controversies involving the Garda Síochána.

See also
List of members of the European Court of Justice

References

1942 births
Living people
Judges of the Supreme Court of Ireland
Advocates General of the European Court of Justice
People educated at Clongowes Wood College
Alumni of University College Dublin
Irish officials of the European Union
Alumni of King's Inns